Akram Yurabayev (born 21 April 1973) is an Uzbekistani sprint canoeist who competed in the mid-1990s. At the 1996 Summer Olympics in Atlanta, he was eliminated in the semifinals of the K-2 500 m event.

External links
Sports-Reference.com profile

1973 births
Canoeists at the 1996 Summer Olympics
Living people
Olympic canoeists of Uzbekistan
Uzbekistani male canoeists